Astrogorgia is a genus of corals belonging to the family Plexauridae.

The species of this genus are found in Southeastern Asia, Indian Ocean.

Species

Species:

Astrogorgia arborea 
Astrogorgia balinensis 
Astrogorgia bayeri

References

Plexauridae
Octocorallia genera